This is a list of active stock exchanges in the Americas. Stock exchanges in Latin America (where Spanish and Portuguese prevail) use the term Bolsa de Valores, meaning "bag" or "purse" of "values". (compare Börse in German or bourse in French).

The Caribbean has one major regional stock exchange: the Eastern Caribbean Securities Exchange (ECSE), which serves Anguilla, Antigua and Barbuda, Dominica, Grenada, Montserrat, Saint Kitts and Nevis, Saint Lucia, and Saint Vincent and the Grenadines. The service area of the ECSE corresponds to the service area of the Eastern Caribbean Central Bank, with which it is associated.

Stock exchanges in the Americas

Former exchanges

Major exchange mergers

See also
 List of futures exchanges
 List of stock exchanges

External links
World-Stock-Exchange.net list of Stock Markets in South America

References

Americas-related lists
Americas